Oreste Muzzi (7 July 1887 – 1946) was an Italian swimmer. He competed in the men's 1500 metre freestyle event at the 1908 Summer Olympics.

References

1887 births
1946 deaths
Italian male swimmers
Olympic swimmers of Italy
Swimmers at the 1908 Summer Olympics
Sportspeople from Florence
Italian male freestyle swimmers